Daujotas was one of the 5 elder Lithuanian dukes mentioned in the peace treaty with Halych-Volhynia in 1219. In the same document Vilikaila is mentioned as brother of Daujotas which suggests that Daujotas was the older or perhaps more influential brother. The brothers are not mentioned in any other sources. Tomas Baranauskas, a modern Lithuanian historian, believes that Vilikaila and Daujotas might be sons of Stekšys, a Lithuanian duke killed in 1214.

References

See also
 List of early Lithuanian dukes

13th-century Lithuanian nobility